Thomas James "Tom" Anderson (24 July 1939 – 28 July 2010) was an Australian sailor and Olympic champion. He competed at the 1972 Summer Olympics in Munich, where he received a gold medal in the dragon class, together with crew members John Cuneo and John Shaw. He was the twin brother of John Anderson.

On 8 February 2000, Anderson was awarded the Australian Sports Medal for his gold medal-winning performance at 1972 Summer Olympics. In 2009 Anderson was inducted into the Queensland Sport Hall of Fame.

In 2018, Anderson was inducted to the Australian Sailing Hall of Fame alongside Cuneo and Shaw.

See also
 List of Olympic medalists in Dragon class sailing

References

External links
 Thomas Anderson's obituary at Sail-World.com
 
 
 
 
 

1939 births
2010 deaths
Australian male sailors (sport)
Olympic sailors of Australia
Olympic gold medalists for Australia
Olympic medalists in sailing
Sailors at the 1968 Summer Olympics – Dragon
Sailors at the 1972 Summer Olympics – Dragon
Medalists at the 1972 Summer Olympics
Recipients of the Australian Sports Medal
Sport Australia Hall of Fame inductees
20th-century Australian people